Przemysław Czarnek (born 11 June 1977) is a Polish politician and academic, who was voivode of the Lubelskie Voivodeship from 2015–2019. He was elected in 2019 as a member of the 9th Sejm as a member of Law and Justice. Czarnek is notable for his opposition to LGBT rights, his controversial comments on women's rights, and supporting corporal punishment for children. He filed a criminal case in opposition to the recognition of Ukrainian victims of the Home Army in the 1944 Sahryń massacre.

On 19 October 2020, Czarnek was appointed Minister of Education and Science. He is a supporter of the ultra-conservative Catholic organization Ordo Iuris.

Childhood and education
Czarnek grew up in Goszczanów in the county of Sieradz in the Łódź Voivodeship of western Poland. His mother was a nurse and his father was a truck driver. He moved to Lublin to live with an uncle at the age of 15.

Czarnek graduated from the John Paul II Catholic University of Lublin (KUL) in 2001 in law, obtained his doctorate in constitutional law from KUL in 2006, and obtained his habilitation at KUL in 2015.

Academic career
Czarnek was appointed as a university professor at KUL on 1 October 2019. According to an analysis by OKO.press, at the time Czarnek's publications had no citations in Scopus, only three citations of his habilitation thesis in Google Scholar, and most of his publications were in low-ranked publications associated with the Catholic Church.

Czarnek was awarded a medal for services rendered to Maria Curie-Skłodowska University (UMCS) on 28 October 2019. During the award ceremony, activist Anna Dąbrowska held up a banner "Medal for the hater – shame". UMCS staff member Tomasz Kitliński said that the decision to award the medal had not been consulted with university staff and was a surprise and that it took place in a context of decreased democracy within the university. Kitliński also stated in an online post: "The governor of Lublin Region prides himself in offending Ukrainians, Muslims, the LGBT community and women, for whom he sees no social role other than the reproduction of children". Czarnek sued Kitliński for allegedly slandering a public official. Art professionals started an online petition to support Kitliński.

Political career
Czarnek was appointed as the voivode of the Lublin Voivodeship in 2015. He was elected as a member of parliament in the 2019 Polish parliamentary election, resigning from his position as voivode. According to Catholic University of Lublin professor of theology , Czarnek's politics come "from the extreme right of the National Radical Camp".

Minister of Science and Education
In early October 2020, Czarnek was announced as the likely new minister of education and science (which was earlier divided into the Ministry of Science and Higher Education, MNISW, and the Ministry of National Education, MEN), shortly before he tested positive for SARS-CoV-2. His nomination was delayed after his SARS-CoV-2 positive status was announced. Czarnek was formally appointed Minister of Science and Education on 19 October 2020.

The heads of 79 universities in Poland released a joint statement criticizing Czarnek's proposed reforms, arguing that they infringed on the autonomy of the universities and obstructed academic freedom while allowing pseudoscientific views to be taught in universities.

Big Pitcher of the Year winner 
On 4 January 2022 Przemysław Czarnek was announced the Big Pitcher of the Year 2021 by the satirical newspaper Tygodnik NIE and the blog Make Life Harder after he defeated anti-abortion activist Kaja Godek in a satirical performance modeled on the competition.

Positions on human rights
Czarnek has made several public statements in relation to human rights. Prior to the 2018 Equality March in Lublin in favor of LGBT rights and the rights of other minorities including the disabled, refugees, ethnic minorities and religious minorities, Czarnek described the march as promoting "perversion, deviance and denaturing" and called for the march to be forbidden by the authorities. 

A 2020 international petition signed by more than 170 academics called for an international boycott of Czarnek for his “homophobic, xenophobic and misogynistic views," and hundreds of Polish academics have called for his dismissal on similar grounds. He has denied the claims of the petitions, claiming that he cannot be misogynistic due to his respect for the Virgin Mary and his wife.

LGBT rights
Czarnek described the 2018 Lublin Equality March as "promoting pedophilia", and said that it should be banned, in contrast to the right of freedom of assembly. Polish Ombudsman Adam Bodnar stated that this can be considered hate speech against participants in the march. Bartosz Staszewski, one of the organizers of the march, sued Czarnek, demanding that Czarnek publicly apologize. The court ruled that he had to apologize, but then he repeated the statement.

During the 2020 Polish presidential election campaign Czarnek stated in a live television broadcast that "[we] should stop listening to this nonsense about human rights, or any equality. These people [LGBT] are not equal to normal people". According to The Guardian, this was "the most homophobic outburst so far" from a member of the ruling party. The Polish National Broadcasting Council stated that Czarnek's statement was legal under Polish law.

On 3 August 2020, Czarnek stated that it was certain that "LGBT ideology was derived from neo marxism and came from the same roots as German Hitlerian national socialism."

When asked in an interview if anti-LGBT rhetoric would lead to young people developing mental health issues, he responded that those issues were not due to anti-LGBT rhetoric but rather "propaganda and LGBT ideology."

Women's rights
On the issue of women's rights, Czarnek has expressed disapproval of women prioritizing career over children, declaring that "Career first, maybe later a child, leads to tragic consequences. If the first child is not born [when the mother is aged] 20–25 years, only at the age of 30, how many children can [the mother] bear? Those are the consequences of telling a woman that she doesn't have to do what she was destined to do by the Lord God."

Children's rights
One of Czarnek's research themes is that corporal punishment for children is allowed by the Polish constitution, as he says it is a method of raising children.

Artistic freedom
In relation to artistic freedom, Czarnek wrote in a publication that "There is also a lack of justification for privileging artistic freedom and freedom of speech at the cost of religious freedom and the associated right to protection of religious sentiment".

Ukrainian victims of war crimes by Poles
In July 2018, a commemoration of the Sahryń massacre, in which hundreds of Ukrainian civilians were killed by the Polish Home Army on 10 March 1944, was held. Czarnek described the commemoration as a "great provocation". He officially informed the police that the commemoration was, according to him, a crime by the president of the Lublin Ukrainians' Association under the Act on the Institute of National Remembrance.

Jewish victims of war crimes by Poles
In 2019, Czarnek opposed a memorial by Polish artist Dorota Nieznalska that commemorated Jews who were killed by Poles during and after the Holocaust. He called the memorial a "scandal" and "anti-Polish" and said that it should be removed. Tomasz Kitliński, who commissioned the memorial, refused to comply.

References 

Law and Justice politicians
Living people
1977 births
Members of the Polish Sejm 2019–2023
People from Koło County
Education ministers of Poland